Mohammad Tahir Khan (born 9 January 1981, Karachi, Sindh) is a Pakistani first-class cricketer who plays for Karachi and has represented Pakistan A. He is a right-arm offbreak bowler and handy lower order batsman.

External links
 

1981 births
Living people
Muhajir people
Karachi cricketers
Pakistani cricketers
Cricketers from Karachi
Karachi Whites cricketers
Karachi Blues cricketers
Pakistan International Airlines cricketers
Karachi Urban cricketers
Sindh cricketers
Karachi Dolphins cricketers
Karachi Zebras cricketers